Usual Cruelty: The Complicity of Lawyers in the Criminal Injustice System (2019) is a nonfiction law book by civil rights lawyer Alec Karakatsanis. The book, argues, that the American legal system is unjust and unequal.

Summary 

After a brief introduction, the book is broken into 3 essays with citations and footnotes, written over the course of Karakatsanis' career.

The Punishment Bureaucracy 

The first essay is The Punishment Bureaucracy: How to Think About "Criminal Justice Reform". It was published in the Yale Law Journal in 2019. In it, Karakatsanis describes perceived injustices of the American criminal system. These include cash bail, unequal treatment under the law, and a lack of rigorous evidence. He calls the criminal system "the punishment bureaucracy".

Although the system individually requires "beyond a reasonable doubt" before someone may be convicted, in aggregate, the system does not require this for its punishments. Karakatsanis argues there is no evidence that criminalizing drug use "address[es] any social ill whatsoever". 

Karakatsanis argues that the outcomes the criminal system creates are the result of choices made by politicians, prosecutors, police, and "elites". He cites several examples that were or were not prosecuted, including waterboarding, the NSA's wiretapping program, Tim DeChristopher's non-serious bid on a federal land auction, the Killing of Eric Garner, and the prosecution of Ramsey Orta following the killing.

Karakatsanis cautions against reforms which do not substantially shrink the criminal system's budget and influence. He recommends working with "deeper politics" rather than the "silo" of reforming prosecutors or prisons. Among others, he approves of programs that build power and employment for formerly incarcerated people, reparations for those harmed by punishment, and reducing the number of operational jails (thus reducing the number of people in prison).

The Human Lawyer 
The second essay describes a fictional "human lawyer" who remembers the human beings affected by her career choices.

Policing, Mass Imprisonment, and the Failure of American Lawyers 
The third essay argues that lawyers should dedicate their time to causes that match the values of the profession.

Reception 
The book was favorably reviewed by Bernice B. Donald in Law360. A former prosecutor in Slate agreed with the book. Karakatsanis was interviewed by National Public Radio. An excerpt of the introduction, focusing on cash bail, was published in Time.

Further reading 
 Publisher site with summary of press coverage

References

2019 non-fiction books
The New Press books
American essay collections